Suzanne Goin is a chef and restaurateur from Los Angeles, California. As a restaurateur, she runs three fine dining restaurants in the Los Angeles area: a.o.c., Lucques, and Tavern, which she runs with partner Caroline Styne, as well as four Larders, a marketplace/restaurant, Lucques Catering and the Larder Baking Company, a wholesale bakery. She is also co-founder of The Hungry Cat with her husband, David Lentz. As an award-winning chef, she was named as one of Food & Wine Magazine's "best new chefs of 1999"  and was nominated for James Beard awards as Outstanding Chef eight times, finally winning the coveted national award in 2016. Her restaurants have been praised by Gourmet magazine, Bon Appétit and Los Angeles Times (which awarded Lucques three stars). Early in her career 2006 Goin won the James Beard award for Best Chef: California as well as for her cookbook, Sunday Suppers at Lucques.

Career
When she was a high school senior at Marlborough School in Los Angeles, she interned at Ma Maison just after the departure of Wolfgang Puck and after graduation, enrolled in Brown University where she graduated with honors. Goin then worked at a series of highly successful restaurants, including Alice Water's Chez Panisse, Todd English's Olives. In the early 1990s, she traveled to France. She worked with Alain Passard at his three star Arpege, along with stints at Didier Oudill's two-star Pain and  Patisserie Christian Pottier. After returning to Los Angeles in 1995, she spent two years at Mark Peel’s celebrated restaurant Campanile ending up as executive chef. Goin has won or been nominated for a total of 11 James Beard Foundation Awards.

Restaurants
In 1998, Suzanne Goin opened Lucques, which won recognition from Food & Wine and Gourmet magazines and also won a James Beard nomination in 2006 for Outstanding Service. In 2002, she opened A.O.C. which won 3 stars from the Los Angeles Times. Her third restaurant, The Hungry Cat, opened in Hollywood in 2005. A casual seafood restaurant, it also received positive reviews. The Larder at Burton Way opened in Beverly Hills in 2013.

Media
Goin's cookbook, Sunday Suppers at Lucques, was published in late 2005. The next year the book received the James Beard Foundation's award for "Best Cookbook From a Professional Viewpoint." She has also made several television appearances including PBS's series Chef's Story and New York Times food critic Mark Bittman's How to Cook Everything.

References

External links
Suzanne Goin at starchefs.com
Suzanne Goin at bonappetit.com

Living people
People from Los Angeles
Brown University alumni
American women restaurateurs
American restaurateurs
American women chefs
James Beard Foundation Award winners
Year of birth missing (living people)
21st-century American women
Chefs from Los Angeles